Ashley Sweet (born 1 April 1989) is a Welsh rugby union player who plays as a lock forward having previously played for Cross Keys RFC, Cardiff RFC, Ebbw Vale RFC, Newport RFC and Pontypool United RFC. He was released by the Dragons regional team at the end of the 2017-18 season.

References

External links 
Dragons profile

Rugby union players from Pontypool
Welsh rugby union players
Dragons RFC players
Living people
1989 births
Pontypool United RFC players
Cross Keys RFC players
Ebbw Vale RFC players
Cardiff RFC players
Newport RFC players
Rugby union locks